Bracy is a surname. Notable people with the surname include:

Clara T. Bracy (1848–1941), English actress
Henry Bracy (1846–1917), Welsh opera singer
Marvin Bracy (born 1993), American sprinter
Napoleon Bracy Jr., American politician
Randolph Bracy (born 1977), American politician
Terrence L. Bracy, American activist